Behind City Lights is a 1945 American crime film directed by John English and written by Richard Weil and Gertrude Walker. The film stars Lynne Roberts, Peter Cookson, Jerome Cowan, Esther Dale, William Terry and Victor Kilian. The film was released on September 10, 1945, by Republic Pictures.

Plot
Small-town girl Jean Lowell is about to wed farmer Ben Coleman, but secretly longs for big-city lights and a more exciting life. A car crash outside the church causes a commotion, and the injured party, a New Yorker by the name of Lance Marlow, is instantly smitten with Jean. The wedding is called off after Ben senses that Jean is distracted. Lance and his partner Perry Borden continue on to New York City, and before long Jean convinces herself that she should follow.

She finds the men and goes with them to a nightclub, where Perry makes fun of her small-town ways and, unbeknownst to her, steals a valuable necklace. Lance and Perry are thieves. Lance intends to quit so that he and Jean can begin a new life, but she takes a gift from him to a jeweler and discovers it is stolen. Things go from bad to worse when Lance is killed. A distraught Jean takes a job working at a diner, but regains happiness when Ben turns up and invites her to return where she belongs.

Cast  
Lynne Roberts as Jean Lowell
Peter Cookson as Lance Marlow
Jerome Cowan as Perry Borden
Esther Dale as Sarah Lowell
William Terry as Ben Coleman
Victor Kilian as Daniel Lowell
Moroni Olsen as Curtis Holbrook
William Forrest as Detective Peterson
Emmett Vogan as Jones
Joseph J. Greene as Gabriel 'Gab' Carson
Frank J. Scannell as Charles Matthews
Tom London as Andrew Coleman
George M. Carleton as Doctor Blodgett
Bud Geary as Fred Haskins
Jeanne Staff as Night Club Singer

References

External links 
 

1945 films
American crime films
1945 crime films
Republic Pictures films
Films directed by John English
American black-and-white films
1940s English-language films
1940s American films